The New Haven Elm Citys played in their first and only season in  1875 as a  member of the National Association of Professional Base Ball Players. They finished eighth in the league with a record of 7-40. The team and league 
folded at the conclusion of the season.

Regular season

Season standings

Record vs. opponents

Roster

Player stats

Batting
Note: G = Games played; AB = At bats; H = Hits; Avg. = Batting average; HR = Home runs; RBI = Runs batted in

Starting pitchers 
Note: G = Games pitched, IP = Innings pitched; W = Wins; L = Losses; ERA = Earned run average; SO = Strikeouts

References
1875 New Haven Elm Citys season at Baseball Reference

New Haven Elm Citys Season, 1875